This is a list of British television related events from 1970.

Events

January
1 January–5 February – BBC2 airs The Six Wives of Henry VIII, a series of six teleplays, each of which focusses on the life of one of King Henry VIII of England's six wives.
3 January  – Jon Pertwee makes his first appearance as the Third Doctor in the Doctor Who serial Spearhead from Space. It also marks the first time that the series is in colour.
4 January  – BBC2 first broadcasts Morning Story, starring Lee Montague.
5 January – The long-running sports themed quiz show A Question of Sport debuts on BBC1.

February
9 February – The science fiction drama series Doomwatch debuts on BBC1, starring John Paul, Simon Oates and Robert Powell.
15 February – BBC1 airs the Ken Russell film Dance of the Seven Veils as part of its Omnibus strand. The film, about German composer Richard Strauss, attracts complaints because of its sex scenes and controversy by depicting Strauss as a Nazi sympathiser. Strauss's family subsequently withdraw their permission for the use of his music, meaning the film cannot be shown again until the copyright on his work has expired. It is not until 2020 that the film is given a second airing, at that year's Keswick Film Festival.
20 February – The popular US children's show The Banana Splits airs on BBC1.

March
30 March – The first episode of the sitcom Up Pompeii is broadcast on BBC1.

April
6 April – HTV starts broadcasting in colour from the Wenvoe transmitting station and from this day, the station becomes known on air as HTV rather than Harlech Television.

May
 31 May–21 June – ITV introduces a studio panel, joining presenters Brian Moore and Jimmy Hill to analyse the latest action in the 1970 World Cup. This is the first time a studio panel of pundits had been used as part of UK sporting coverage.

June

 18 June – General election results are shown on BBC1 and ITN in colour for the first time.

July
8 July – Jack Walker dies off-screen of a heart attack in Coronation Street as a result of the death of actor Arthur Leslie. Jack becomes the first major character to be written out due to the death of an actor.
16–25 July – The BBC covers of the 1970 Commonwealth Games with the afternoon events broadcast live, resulting in approximately three hours a day of live coverage each day plus a highlights programme broadcast at 8pm during the week.
17 July – Tyne Tees Television starts broadcasting in colour from the Pontop Pike transmitting station.

August
3 August – The UK's final 405-lines television transmitter is switched on at Newhaven, East Sussex. All future transmitters are at the higher definition 625-lines.
6 August – A BBC2 broadcast of Christopher Marlowe's 16th century drama Edward II features the first same-sex kiss on British television, between Ian McKellen (as Edward) and James Laurenson (as Piers Gaveston, Edward's favourite).
19 August – ITV airs what is billed as the 1000th episode of Coronation Street. A souvenir edition of TVTimes is also published for the episode, even though it is in fact, the 999th.
August – Yorkshire and Tyne Tees Television announce plans to merge when the two are brought under the control of Trident Television Limited, a company formed to deal with the problem of effective ownership of the Bilsdale UHF transmitter and the allocation of airtime.

September
12 September – ITV broadcast the children's sitcom Here Come the Double Deckers.
14 September 
Ulster Television launches a colour service, but only from the Divis transmitting station. To mark the change, the logo is redesigned.
The first colour edition of Blue Peter is aired on BBC1, but the last black and white edition will be transmitted on 24 June 1974. The programme alternates between colour and black and white depending on studio allocation.
The Nine O'Clock News is first broadcast on BBC1. The programme airs until 13 October 2000 when the station's main evening bulletin is switched to 10pm.
16 September – Gerry Anderson's live action science fiction series UFO airs on ITV.
17 September – The hugely popular American cartoon show Scooby-Doo, Where Are You? makes its first UK television appearance on BBC1.
18 September – London Weekend Television launches its famous river ident.
19 September – The American cartoon series The Pink Panther Show makes its debut on BBC1.

October
1 October — Anglia Television starts broadcasting in colour from the Tacolneston transmitting station.
15 October – BBC1 launch the popular Play for Today which showcases one-off dramas by a diverse variety of writers and directors.
17 October – The children's literacy programme Words and Pictures debuts on BBC1.

November
 7 November – Felix Dennis becomes the first person to use the word "cunt" on British television during a live broadcast of The Frost Programme.
 8 November – BBC2 show the first episode of the comedy sketch show The Goodies starring Tim Brooke-Taylor, Graeme Garden and  Bill Oddie. 
13 November – The Colour Strike begins when ITV staff refuse to work with colour television equipment following a dispute over pay with their management.
18 November – The first episode of the long-running children's movie themed quiz show Screen Test is broadcast on BBC1.
23 November – The first edition of Engineering Announcements is broadcast on ITV.

December
9 December – 10th anniversary of the first episode of Coronation Street.
25 December – Pluto's Christmas Tree is broadcast on BBC1, the first complete Mickey Mouse cartoon to be shown on British television in colour.

Debuts

BBC1
3 January – It's Cliff Richard! (1970–1974)
4 January – Ivanhoe (1970)
5 January – A Question of Sport (1970–present)
2 February – A Stranger on the Hills (1970)
3 February – On Trial (1970)
9 February – Doomwatch (1970–1972)
20 February – The Banana Splits (1968–1970)
6 April – The Adventures of Parsley (1970–1971)
24 April – The Culture Vultures (1970)
29 May – Tarbuck's Luck (1970–1972)
2 July – The Great Inimitable Mr. Dickens (1970)
20 August – Hope and Keen's Crazy House (1970–1972)
12 September – Here Come the Double Deckers! (1970–1971)
13 September – The Black Tulip (1970)
14 September 
 Nine O'Clock News (1970–2000)
 Ryan International
17 September 
Bachelor Father (1970–1971)
Scooby-Doo, Where Are You? (1969–1970)
19 September – The Pink Panther Show (1969–1980)
15 October – Play for Today (1970–1984)
17 October – Words and Pictures (1970–2001, 2006–2007)
24 October – If It's Saturday, It Must Be Nimmo  (1970)
25 October – Little Women (1970)
27 October – Dastardly and Muttley in Their Flying Machines (1969–1970)
18 November – Screen Test (1970–1984)
23 November – Drama Playhouse (1970; 1972)

BBC2
1 January – The Six Wives of Henry VIII (1970)
5 January – Barry Humphries' Scandals (1970)
19 January – Germinal (1970)
15 February – The Woodlanders (1970)
15 March – Daniel Deronda (1970)
22 March – Charley's Grants (1970)
7 April – Codename (1970)
26 April – The Spoils of Poynton (1970)
31 May – Villette (1970)
6 August – Edward II (1970)
9 August – Sentimental Education (1970)
22 September – The Roads to Freedom (1970)
27 September – Oh in Colour (1970)
29 September – Menace (1970–1973)
8 November – The Goodies (1970–1982)
1 December – Deep Sea Dick (1970)
4 December – Waugh on Crime (1970–1971)

ITV
2 January – 
Aquarius (1970–1977)
Manhunt (1970)
3 January – The Val Doonican Show (1970–1975)
6 January – Kate (1970–1972)
7 January – Redgauntlet (1970)
14 February – Wicked Women (1970)
15 February – Catweazle (1970–1971)
17 February – The Tribe That Hides From Man (1970)
3 March – The Misfit (1970–1971)
4 March – Smith (1970)
9 March – David Nixon's Magic Box (1970–1971)
16 March – Crime of Passion (1970–1973)
1 April – Shine a Light (1970)
2 April – Norman (1970)
14 April – A Family at War (1970–1972)
20 April – For the Love of Ada (1970–1971)
13 June – Albert and Victoria (1970–1971)
17 June – Shadows of Fear (1970–1971)
23 June – His and Hers (1970–1972)
3 July – Confession (1970)
5 July – Two D's and a Dog (1970)
10 July – The Kenny Everett Explosion (1970)
11 July – The Sky's the Limit (1970–1974)
29 July – 
Ace of Wands (1970–1972)
Husbands and Lovers (1970)
3 August – Bright's Boffins (1970–1972)
4 August – Never Say Die (1970)
28 August – If It Moves, File It (1970)
30 August – Big Brother (1970)
15 September – Skippy the Bush Kangaroo (1968–1970)
16 September – UFO (1970–1971)
18 September 
 Conceptions of Murder (1970)
 From a Bird's Eye View (1970–1971)
24 September – On the House (1970–1971)
28 September – Timeslip (1970–1971)
3 October – The Adventures of Don Quick (1970)
9 October – The Mating Machine (1970)
27 October – The Lovers (1970–1971)
28 October 
 The Adventures of Rupert Bear (1970–1977)
 Wreckers at Dead Eye  (1970)
30 October – Tales of Unease (1970)
31 October – Ev (1970–1971)
4 November – Macbeth (1970)
5 November – Queenie's Castle (1970–1972)
18 November – Diamond Crack Diamond (1970)
24 November – Grady (1970)
14 December  – Man at the Top (1970–1972)

Television shows

Returning this year after a break of one year or longer
Andy Pandy (1950, 1970, 2002–2005)
Steptoe and Son (1962–1965, 1970–1974)

Continuing television shows

1920s
BBC Wimbledon (1927–1939, 1946–2019, 2021–2024)

1930s
The Boat Race (1938–1939, 1946–2019)
BBC Cricket (1939, 1946–1999, 2020–2024)

1940s
Come Dancing (1949–1998)

1950s
Watch with Mother (1952–1975) 
The Good Old Days (1953–1983)
Panorama (1953–present)
Dixon of Dock Green (1955–1976)
Crackerjack (1955–1984, 2020–present)
Opportunity Knocks (1956–1978, 1987–1990)
This Week (1956–1978, 1986–1992)
Armchair Theatre (1956–1974)
What the Papers Say (1956–2008)
The Sky at Night (1957–present)
Blue Peter (1958–present)
Grandstand (1958–2007)

1960s
Coronation Street (1960–present)
Songs of Praise (1961–present)
Z-Cars (1962–1978)
Animal Magic (1962–1983)
Doctor Who (1963–1989, 1996, 2005–present)
World in Action (1963–1998)
Top of the Pops (1964–2006)
Match of the Day (1964–present)
Crossroads (1964–1988, 2001–2003)
Play School (1964–1988)
Mr. and Mrs. (1965–1999)
World of Sport (1965–1985)
All Gas and Gaiters (1966–1971)
Jackanory (1965–1996, 2006)
Sportsnight (1965–1997)
It's a Knockout (1966–1982, 1999–2001)
The Money Programme (1966–2010)
Never Mind the Quality, Feel the Width (1967–1971)
Callan (1967–1972)
The Golden Shot (1967–1975)
Playhouse (1967–1982)
Me Mammy (1968–1971)
Please Sir! (1968–1972)
Father, Dear Father (1968–1973)
Dad's Army (1968–1977)
Magpie (1968–1980)
The Big Match (1968–2002)
On the Buses (1969–1973)
Clangers (1969–1974, 2015–present)
Monty Python's Flying Circus (1969–1974)
Nationwide (1969–1983)
Screen Test (1969–1984)

Ending this year
 Andy Pandy (1950–1970, 2002–2005)
 The Wednesday Play (1964–1970)
 Not Only... But Also (1965–1970)
 Not in Front of the Children (1967–1970)
 Randall and Hopkirk (Deceased) (1969–1970)
 Scooby Doo, Where Are You! (1969–1970)
 Department S (TV series) (1969–1970)

Births
10 February – Robert Shearman, broadcast scriptwriter
14 February – Simon Pegg, comedian, writer and actor
7 March 
Emma Davies, actress
Rachel Weisz, British actress
29 March – Ruth England, presenter and actress
3 April – Lucy Alexander, presenter 
5 April – Krishnan Guru-Murthy, journalist and presenter
9 April – Tricia Penrose, actress and singer
10 May – Sally Phillips, Hong Kong-born English comedy actress
15 May – Nicola Walker, actress
20 May – Louis Theroux, presenter and author
22 May – Naomi Campbell, model (The Face)
18 June – Katie Derham, newsreader and television presenter
25 June –  Lucy Benjamin, actress
7 July – Zoë Tyler, singer and actress
10 July – John Simm, actor
13 July – Sharon Horgan, English-born Irish comedy writer-performer
29 July – Andi Peters, presenter and producer
4 August – Kate Silverton, journalist, newsreader and television presenter
7 August – Melanie Sykes, presenter
5 September – Johnny Vegas, actor and comedian
6 September – Emily Maitlis, journalist and newsreader
13 September – Louise Lombard, actress
28 September – Jo Wyatt, actress, voice actress and singer
29 September – Emily Lloyd, actress
31 October – Craig Kelly, actor
12 November – Harvey Spencer Stephens, child actor
22 November – Stel Pavlou, novelist and screenwriter
23 November – Zoe Ball, television and radio presenter
28 November 
Lucy Owen, Welsh television newsreader
Richard Osman, television presenter 
10 December – Susanna Reid, journalist and television presenter
17 December – Craig Doyle, broadcast presenter
21 December – Jamie Theakston, broadcast presenter and producer
29 December – Aled Jones, singer and presenter
Unknown – Jenny Scott, journalist and economist

Deaths
30 June – Arthur Leslie, actor (Coronation Street), aged 70

See also

 1970 in British music
 1970 in British radio
 1970 in the United Kingdom
 List of British films of 1970

References